The Mixed Team BC1-BC2 boccia competition at the 2004 Summer Paralympics was held from 26 to 28 September at the Ano Liosia Olympic Hall.

The event was won by the team representing .

Results

Preliminaries

Pool S

Pool T

Competition bracket

Team Lists

References

X